Rowan Lewis Vine (born 21 September 1982) is an English footballer who is currently manager of Hartley Wintney.

A striker, Vine previously played League football for Portsmouth, Brentford, Colchester United, Luton Town, Birmingham City, Queens Park Rangers (QPR), Hull City, Milton Keynes Dons, Exeter City, Gillingham, St Johnstone, Hibernian and Greenock Morton, and non-league football for Welling United, Havant & Waterlooville, Gosport Borough (three spells), Basingstoke Town, Southall (two spells), Hayes & Yeading United, Hartley Wintney (two spells), Alresford Town, Moneyfields, Tadley Calleva and Hemel Hempstead Town.

Career
Vine was born in Basingstoke, and began his career at Portsmouth, making his way through the club's youth scheme. He made his first-team debut at the age of 18, in a goalless draw with Sheffield United in December 2000.  However, he struggled to break into the side on a regular basis and was loaned out to Division Two side Brentford for the 2002–03 season.

Vine enjoyed a successful campaign at Griffin Park, netting his first ever goal on his debut in a 2–0 win at Huddersfield Town, and going on to score 13 further goals in 44 starts for the Bees.  Despite his impressive season, he was again loaned out, this time to Colchester United for the 2003–04 campaign; he scored 10 league goals in 30 starts.

For the third year running, Vine spent an entire season away from Portsmouth on loan, this time at Luton Town for the 2004–05 season. Vine's nine goals helped the Hatters clinch the League One title. Despite this relative lack of goals for a striker during a season, a section in the Luton News newspaper showed that Vine was the "King of Assists" – one of the main reasons for the Hatters' success.

Vine signed for Luton for an undisclosed fee, reported as £250,000, on 4 July 2005. In his first season after his permanent move to the club, he scored 10 goals in 30 games after missing the start of the season with a back injury. Again, he was near the top of the assist charts.

A £2.5 million deal took Vine to Football League Championship club Birmingham City on 11 January 2007; the fee was to rise to £3m if Birmingham gained promotion to the Premier League. Vine's only goal in his short stay at Birmingham came in a 1–0 win over Derby County in March 2007, but he played 17 times as the club were promoted as runners-up.

On 2 October 2007, he joined Queens Park Rangers on loan, initially for a month, but later extended into the new year. Vine signed a four-and-a-half-year contract with the club on 8 January 2008 for a fee of £1 million.

Vine suffered a serious fracture of his left tibia and fibula on 3 April 2008 during a training session. He did not make another first-team appearance until April 2009, and thereafter was used mainly as a substitute. Manager Neil Warnock told him in July 2010 that he had no future with the club, and was not given a squad number for the new season. He joined Hull City on a month's loan on 1 October, and made his debut the following day at the KC Stadium in a goalless draw with Coventry City.

On 25 November 2010 he started a loan period at Brentford until 4 January 2011, but never played. He joined Milton Keynes Dons on an initial one-month loan on 15 January, and scored his only goal for the club in a 4–1 win at Rochdale.

A trial with Doncaster Rovers in July 2011 came to nothing, and at the start of the 2011–12 season, Vine spent time on loan at Exeter City. In March 2012, he had a trial with Southend United, but manager Paul Sturrock expressed concerns over his fitness. He then signed for Gillingham on loan until the end of the season. He scored his only goal for Gillingham in a 2–1 defeat to Dagenham & Redbridge.

Queens Park Rangers released Vine at the end of the 2011–12 season, and after a trial, he signed a one-year contract with Scottish Premier League club St Johnstone. He made his debut in the opening game of the season, and was sent off for a second bookable offence in the next, a 1–1 draw with Motherwell. Citing the poor example he set to his young son, he vowed to pull out of tackles in future rather than risk another sending-off. When scoring for St Johnstone, Vine celebrated by making a 'T' gesture.

On 15 September, Vine scored his first goal for the club, a curling effort ten minutes from time against reigning SPL champions Celtic that gave St Johnstone their first win of the season. After the match, he described the goal as "right up there" in his career highlights. He finished the season as joint top scorer in the league, with seven goals, but was not offered a contract extension. New manager Tommy Wright suggested it was down to budgetary constraints, but Vine was critical of the manner in which the club had handled his departure, accusing them of a lack of respect.

Vine moved on to Hibernian on a one-year deal, joining up with St Johnstone teammate Liam Craig. After a match against Celtic in October, opposing manager Neil Lennon was critical of Vine's tackling. Vine's retaliation on social media brought him a charge of "making offensive comments on Twitter suggesting the use of violence", but the Scottish Football Association let him off with a warning. After failing to score in 14 appearances, he was told by manager Terry Butcher that he would "struggle to break into the Hibs team", and in January 2014, his contract with Hibernian was cancelled by mutual consent.

As the January 2014 transfer window closed, Vine signed for Greenock Morton. He left Morton in the summer of 2014 after the club were relegated.

Vine returned to England, where he signed for Conference Premier club Welling United in January 2015. He played only twice, and after a brief spell with Havant & Waterlooville, he joined National League South club Gosport Borough in October 2015. After a brief period with Basingstoke Town between 2015 and 2016, he rejoined Gosport in January 2017.

In February 2017, having made only three appearances since his return to Gosport, Vine joined Southall of the Spartan South Midlands League. At the beginning of the 2017–18 season, he moved to Hayes & Yeading United. Following a four-month spell with Hartley Wintney, Vine rejoined Gosport in March 2018.

In 2018-19, Vine played for Wessex League club Alresford Town before joining Hartley Wintney again in October and then re-joining Southall in December. He joined Moneyfields in February 2019 before joining Tadley Calleva in August 2019. Vine joined Hemel Hempstead Town as a player-coach for the 2020-21 season.

Managerial career
On 20 January 2023, Vine was appointed manager of former club Hartley Wintney.

Career statistics

Honours
Luton Town
 Football League One: 2004–05

Birmingham City
 Football League Championship second-place promotion: 2006–07

Individual
 Football League One Player of the Month: September 2004

References

1982 births
Living people
Sportspeople from Basingstoke
English footballers
Association football forwards
Portsmouth F.C. players
Brentford F.C. players
Colchester United F.C. players
Luton Town F.C. players
Birmingham City F.C. players
Queens Park Rangers F.C. players
Hull City A.F.C. players
Milton Keynes Dons F.C. players
Exeter City F.C. players
Gillingham F.C. players
St Johnstone F.C. players
Hibernian F.C. players
Greenock Morton F.C. players
Welling United F.C. players
Havant & Waterlooville F.C. players
Gosport Borough F.C. players
Basingstoke Town F.C. players
Southall F.C. players
Hayes & Yeading United F.C. players
Hartley Wintney F.C. players
Alresford Town F.C. players
Moneyfields F.C. players
Hemel Hempstead Town F.C. players
English Football League players
Scottish Premier League players
Scottish Professional Football League players
National League (English football) players
Southern Football League players
Footballers from Hampshire
Wessex Football League players
Hartley Wintney F.C. managers